22 Camelopardalis is a binary star system in the northern circumpolar constellation of Camelopardalis, located 212 light years away from the Sun. It has an apparent visual magnitude of 7.03, which is below the normal limit for visibility with the naked eye. This object is moving further from the Earth with a mean heliocentric radial velocity of +10 km/s. Eggen (1991) listed it as a member of the IC 2391 supercluster. It has also been catalogued as a member of the Hyades group. However, Griffin (2005) suggests it belongs to neither.

This is a single-lined spectroscopic binary system with an orbital period of 81.5 days and a significant eccentricity of 0.14. This value provides a lower bound on the true semimajor axis of their orbit.

The visible component is an F-type main-sequence star with a stellar classification of F5 V. It is an estimated 1.5 billion years old with 1.3 times the mass of the Sun and 1.7 times the Sun's radius. It is radiating 5.2 times the Sun's luminosity from its photosphere at an effective temperature of 6,732 K.

References

F-type main-sequence stars
Spectroscopic binaries
Camelopardalis (constellation)
Durchmusterung objects
Camelopardalis, 22
037070
026587